Plesiothyreus is a genus of very small sea snails or limpets, marine gastropod mollusks in the subfamily Phenacolepadinae  of the family Phenacolepadidae.

Species
Species within the genus Plesiothyreus include:
 Plesiothyreus aculeatus (Pease, 1868)
 Plesiothyreus arabicus (K.H.J. Thiele, 1909 ) (synonym: Phenacolepas arabica K.H.J. Thiele, 1909)
 Plesiothyreus brocki (Thiele, 1909)
 Plesiothyreus cancellatus (Pease, 1861)
 Plesiothyreus cinnamomeus (Gould, 1846)
 Plesiothyreus compressus (Pease, 1868)
 Plesiothyreus cosmanni Jousseaume, 1894
 Plesiothyreus cytherae (Lesson, 1831)
 Plesiothyreus elongatus (Thiele, 1909)
 Plesiothyreus evansi (Biggs, 1973)
 Plesiothyreus fischeri (Rochebrune, 1882)
 Plesiothyreus galathea (J.B.P.A. Lamarck, 1819) (synonym: Phenacolepas galathea (J.B.P.A. Lamarck, 1819)
 Plesiothyreus granocostatus (Pease, 1868)
 Plesiothyreus granulosus (Thiele, 1909)
 Plesiothyreus guttatus (Thiele, 1909)
 Plesiothyreus hamillei (P. Fischer, 1857)
 Plesiothyreus indicus (Thiele, 1909)
 Plesiothyreus malonei (Vanatta, 1912)
 Plesiothyreus newtoni G. B. Sowerby III, 1894
 Plesiothyreus omanensis (Biggs, 1973)
 Plesiothyreus pararabicus (Christiaens, 1988)
 † Plesiothyreus parmophoroides (Cossmann, 1885) 
 Plesiothyreus peelae Christiaens, 1989
 † Plesiothyreus pliocenicus (Chirli, 2004) 
 Plesiothyreus puntarenae (Mörch, 1860)
 Plesiothyreus radiatus (Schepman, 1908)
 Plesiothyreus reticulatus (Thiele, 1909)
 Plesiothyreus scobinatus (A. Gould, 1859)
Species brought into synonymy
 Plesiothyreus asperulatus (A. Adams, 1854): synonym of Phenacolepas galathea (Lamarck, 1819): synonym of Zacalantica galathea (Lamarck, 1819) (based on nomen nudum)
 Plesiothyreus cosmani Jousseaume, 1894: synonym of Plesiothyreus cossmanni Jousseaume, 1894 (incorrect original spelling)
 Plesiothyreus rushii (Dall, 1889): synonym of Hyalopatina rushii (Dall, 1889)
 Plesiothyreus gruveli (Dautzenberg, 1929) (uncertain > taxon inquirendum)

References

External links
 Cossmann M. (1886–1913). Catalogue illustré des coquilles fossiles de l'Eocène des environs de Paris. Annales de la Société Royale Malacologique de Belgique. Part 1: vol. 21 [1886]. Part 2: vol. 22 [1887]. Part 3: vol. 23 [1888]. Part 4: vol. 24 [1889]. Part 5 + Suppl. : vol. 26
 Pilsbry H.A. (1891). On the use of the generic name Scutellina. The Nautilus. 5(8): 88–89
 Broderip W.J. (1834). Description of a new genus of Gasteropoda. Proceedings of the Zoological Society of London. 2: 47–49
 Iredale, T. (1929). Queensland molluscan notes, no. 1. Memoirs of the Queensland Museum. 9(3): 261–297, pls 30–31
 Fukumori H., Yahagi T., Warén A. & Kano Y. (2019). Amended generic classification of the marine gastropod family Phenacolepadidae: transitions from snails to limpets and shallow-water to deep-sea hydrothermal vents and cold seeps. Zoological Journal of the Linnean Society. 185(3): 636–655

Phenacolepadidae